The 2016 Women's Ford National Hockey League was the 18th edition of the women's field hockey tournament. The competition was held in 6 cities across New Zealand, from 17 August to 23 September. 

Canterbury won the title for the 3rd time, defeating North Harbour 3–2 in the final. Midlands finished in third place after winning the third place match 2–1 over Auckland.

Participating Teams
The following eight teams competed for the title:

 Auckland
 Canterbury
 Capital
 Central
 Midlands
 Northland
 North Harbour

Results

Preliminary round

Fixtures

Classification round

Fifth and sixth place

Third and fourth place

Final

Statistics

Final standings

Statistics

References

External links
Official website

Hockey
Ford National Hockey League
New Zealand National Hockey League seasons
Women's field hockey in New Zealand